"Better On My Own" is a song recorded by Finnish singer Krista Siegfrids. The song was released as a digital download in Finland on 14 August 2015. The song peaked at number 24 on the Finnish Download Chart and number 74 on the Finnish Airplay Chart.

Music video
A music video to accompany the release of "Better On My Own" was first released onto YouTube on 14 August 2015 at a total length of three minutes and forty-six seconds.

Track listing

Chart performance

Weekly charts

Release history

References

2015 singles
2015 songs
Krista Siegfrids songs
Songs written by Patric Sarin
Songs written by Joonas Angeria
Songs written by Krista Siegfrids